John Stephens (June 25, 1835 – unknown) was an American politician who was twice elected as Coroner of Cook County on the Republican ticket. Born to a German American family in Albany, New York, Stephens moved to Chicago with his family when he was four years of age. Prior to his political career, he served in the Chicago Fire Department and as a Sergeant in the Union Army.

References

1840 births
Date of death unknown
Cook County Coroners
Illinois Republicans